The 1948 United States Senate election in Maine was held on September 13, 1948. Incumbent Republican U.S. Senator and Senate Majority Leader Wallace White did not seek a fourth term in office. 

U.S. Representative Margaret Chase Smith defeated the two most recent Governors of Maine, Horace Hildreth and Sumner Sewall, in the Republican primary. In the general election, Smith resoundingly defeated Democrat Adrian Scolten of Portland.

Smith was the first woman ever elected to a full term in the U.S. Senate without first being appointed. Smith's election also made her the first woman to serve in both houses of the United States Congress, as well as the first woman to represent the state of Maine in the Senate.

Republican primary

Candidates
Albion P. Beverage
Horace Hildreth, Governor of Maine since 1945
Sumner Sewall, former Governor of Maine from 1941 to 1945
 Margaret Chase Smith, U.S. Representative from Skowhegan

Results

Democratic primary

Candidates
Adrian Scolten

Results
Scolten was unopposed for the Democratic nomination.

General election

Results

See also 
 1948 United States Senate elections

References

Notes

Maine
1948